Mohamad Izzuddin bin Mohd Roslan (born 8 December 1999) is a Malaysian professional footballer who plays as a midfielder for Malaysia Super League club Negeri Sembilan.

Club Career 
In 2022 he joined the team Negeri Sembilan FC on a free transfer. Has been with the team for one year and has become an important player throughout 2022. He has helped the team secure fourth place in the Malaysia Super League in 2022. It is an impressive achievement as the team has just been promoted from the Malaysia Premier League in the previous year and had shocked the other Malaysia Super League teams as Negeri Sembilan FC was considered an underdog team. He has made 18 appearances during his time with Negeri Sembilan FC.

Honours
Malaysia U19
 AFF U-19 Youth Championship: 2018; runner-up: 2017

References

External links 
 

1999 births
People from Kuala Lumpur
Living people
Malaysian footballers
Association football midfielders
Perak F.C. players
Negeri Sembilan FC players
Malaysia Super League players